A Mariña Occidental is a comarca in the Galician Province of Lugo. The overall population of this  local region is 25,659 (2019).

Municipalities
Cervo, Ourol, O Vicedo, Viveiro and Xove.

References

Comarcas of the Province of Lugo